The Rapiños de Occidente (Western Raptors) was a Venezuelan baseball club that played from 1957 through 1963 in the Liga Occidental de Béisbol Profesional (Western Professional Baseball League). They played their home games at the old olympic stadium based in Maracaibo, Zulia.

Team history
The Rapiños (rah-pee'nyoz) were the most successful team during the 10 years of existence of the league, while collecting a total of five titles during their six seasons in the circuit. The team entered the league in the 1957–1958 tournament as a replacement for the departed Gavilanes de Maracaibo. 

Managed by Ira Hutchinson, the Rapiños won their first pennant in their league debut. Following an agreement between the Venezuelan Professional Baseball League and the LOBP, the interleague playoff games would be played immediately following the end of their respective 1957–1958 seasons. As a result, the winning team would represent Venezuela in the 1958 Caribbean Series. Then, the Rapiños were swept by the Industriales de Valencia, 4–0, in the best-of-seven series. 

After that, the Rapiños won three consecutive pennants to set a record of four titles in a row in Venezuelan baseball history. In the same way, catcher/manager Les Moss posted a managing record with his three consecutive titles. Both records still remain intact.

The Rapiños failed again in the 1958–1959 playoffs series, losing to the Indios de Oriente in the maximum of seven games. A new opportunity arose when the 1959–1960 Venezuelan Professional Baseball League season was suspended due to a players' strike, and the Rapiños were invited to participate in the 1960 Caribbean Series. The team ended in last place with a 1-5 record, while their only victory came at expense of the Puerto Rico team. 

The team clinched their fourth pennant in the 1960–1961 season, but the beginning of the end came when the 1961–1962 was cancelled. After that, the league resumed operations in 1962–1963, while the Rapiños claimed their fifth pennant, but the average attendance was less than half what it was in previous years.

Finally, the LOBP folded on December 3, 1963, due to economic pressure and internal conflicts, just one month later after starting the 1963–1964 season. The Rapiños faded with the league, standing in last place with a record of 6-13, when the four team circuit disbanded.

Regular Season Team Records

Notable players

Fritz Ackley   
Teolindo Acosta   
Luis Aparicio 
Bob Aspromonte 
Ken Berry   
Ted Bowsfield 
Angel Bravo 
Don Buford 
Johnny Callison 
Cam Carreon 
Norm Cash 
Glenn Cox 
Jerry Dahlke  
Dutch Dotterer 
Tom Flanigan 
Luis ″Camaleón″ García 
Pat Gillick 
Sam Hairston 
Ed Hobaugh 
Dave Hoskins  
Stan Johnson 
Deacon Jones 
Lewis Joyce 
Julián Ladera 
Barry Latman 
Jim McAnany  
J. C. Martin 
Joe Morgan 
Les Moss  
Billy Muffett  
Gary Peters 
Taylor Phillips 
Larry Raines 
Ed Rakow 
Mike Roarke 
Floyd Robinson 
Fred Talbot 
Bobby Winkles 
Corky Withrow

See also
Rapiños de Occidente players

Sources
Gutiérrez, Daniel; Alvarez, Efraim; Gutiérrez (h), Daniel (2006). La Enciclopedia del Béisbol en Venezuela. LVBP, Caracas.

External links
Historia de la Liga Venezolana de Béisbol Profesional (Spanish)
La Historia del Béisbol en el Zulia: 1953-1954 – 1999-2000 (Spanish)
XII Serie del Caribe (1960) (Spanish)

1957 establishments in Venezuela
Defunct baseball teams in Venezuela
Liga Occidental de Béisbol Profesional
Sport in Maracaibo
Baseball teams established in 1957